Kim Thúy Ly Thanh, CQ (born 1968 in Saigon, South Vietnam) is a Vietnamese-born Canadian writer, whose debut novel Ru won the Governor General's Award for French-language fiction at the 2010 Governor General's Awards.

Life and career

At the age of ten, Thúy left Vietnam with her parents and two brothers, joining more than one million Vietnamese boat people fleeing the country's communist regime after the fall of Saigon in 1975. Her family arrived at a refugee camp in Malaysia, run by the United Nations High Commission for Refugees, where they spent four months before a Canadian delegation selected her parents for refugee status on account of their French-language proficiency. In late 1979, Thúy and her family arrived in Granby, in the Eastern Townships of Quebec, and later settled in Montreal.

Thúy earned a bachelor's degree from the Université de Montréal in linguistics and translation (1990), and later earned a law degree from the same school (1993).
 In her early career, Thúy worked as a translator and interpreter and was later recruited by the Montreal-based law firm Stikeman Elliott to help with a Vietnam-based project. In this capacity, she returned to Vietnam as one of a group of Canadian experts advising the country's Communist leadership on their tentative steps toward capitalism. She met her husband while working at the same firm, and the couple had their first child while on assignment in Vietnam. Their second child was born after the couple relocated to Bangkok, Thailand on account of her husband's work.

After moving back to Montreal, Thúy opened a restaurant called Ru de Nam, where she introduced modern Vietnamese cuisine to Montrealers. She worked as a restaurateur for five years, after which she dedicated one full year to creative writing, and landed a publishing contract for her first book thanks to a former patron of Ru de Nam.

In 2015, Thúy was one of the recipients of the Top 25 Canadian Immigrant Awards presented by Canadian Immigrant Magazine.

In 2017, Thúy was the recipient of an Honorary Doctorate from Concordia University.

She was nominated for the New Academy Prize in Literature in 2018.

Work
Thúy's debut novel Ru won the Governor General's Award for French-language fiction at the 2010 Governor General's Awards. An English edition, translated by Sheila Fischman, was published in 2012. The novel was a shortlisted nominee for the 2012 Scotiabank Giller Prize and the 2013 Amazon.ca First Novel Award. The novel won the 2015 edition of Canada Reads, where it was championed by Cameron Bailey.

In 2016, Thúy published her third novel, Vi. An English translation, again by Fischman, was published in 2018. The book was named as a longlisted nominee for the 2018 Scotiabank Giller Prize.

Bibliography

Ru (2009)
 À toi (2011), co-written with Pascal Janovjak
 Mãn (2013)
 Vi (2016)
 Le secret des Vietnamiennes (2017)
 L’Autisme expliqué aux non-autistes (2017), collaborated with Brigitte Harrisson and Lise St-Charles
 Le poisson et l'oiseau (2019)
 Em (2020)

Awards and Honours 

 2010 : RTL-Lire Grand Prize for Ru
 2010 : La Presse General Public Award, Montréal Book Fair, Essay category
 2010 : Governor-general's Award, novels category for Ru
 2011 : Premio Mondello Award for Multiculturalism
 2011 : Archambault Grand Literary Award for the novel Ru

 2013 : Award for Tolerance Paul-Gérin-Lajoie, awarded in 2013 by the Committee for Respect for Diversity
 2015 : Knightess of the National Order of Québec, Government of Québec
 2016 : Spokesperson for Petit Robert between 2016 and 2018, Kim Thúy was featured in the 2018 edition of the Robert illustré
 2017 : Honorary Doctorate from Concordia University for the use of her eloquent voice to highlight the experience of refugees
 2017 : Medal of Honour from the National Assembly of Québec

 2018 : Women's Merit Award from the Women's Y Foundation of Montréal

 2018 : Finalist for the alternate Nobel Prize for Literature
 2019 : Companion of the Order of Arts and Letters of Québec

 2019 : Honorary Doctorate from Bishop's University for significant civic and community contributions
 2022: President of the Selection Committee for the Ulrick-Chérubin Award

References

External links

1968 births
Canadian women novelists
Writers from Quebec
People from Ho Chi Minh City
People from Longueuil
Vietnamese emigrants to Canada
Vietnamese novelists
Living people
Canadian writers of Asian descent
Writers of Vietnamese descent
Governor General's Award-winning fiction writers
21st-century Canadian novelists
21st-century Canadian women writers
Canadian novelists in French
Université de Montréal alumni